Krantikari Yuva Sangathan (KYS) is a student organization in India. KYS formed at University of Delhi by working class students of School of Open Learning (SOL). It is operating in Delhi, Haryana and more states in India.

References 

Students' unions in India
Marxism–Leninism